Real-time collaboration may refer to the use of various different types of software for collaboration between people in real-time, such as:
 Instant messaging and chat rooms
 Videoconferencing
 Real-time collaborative editing of documents
 Desktop sharing